Boško Radulović (born 6 October 1996) is a Montenegrin swimmer. He competed in the men's 50 metre butterfly event at the 2017 World Aquatics Championships.

In 2019, he represented Montenegro at the 2019 World Aquatics Championships held in Gwangju, South Korea and he finished in 79th place in the heats in the men's 50 metre freestyle event. He also competed in the men's 50 metre butterfly event.

References

External links
 

1996 births
Living people
Montenegrin male swimmers
Montenegrin male freestyle swimmers
Male butterfly swimmers
Swimmers at the 2020 Summer Olympics
Olympic swimmers of Montenegro
Place of birth missing (living people)